Teesdale is a dale, or valley, in Northern England. The dale is in the River Tees’s drainage basin, most water flows stem from or converge into said river, including the Skerne and Leven.

Upper Teesdale, more commonly just Teesdale, falls between the Durham and Yorkshire Dales. Large parts of Upper Teesdale are in the North Pennines AONB (Area of Outstanding Natural Beauty) - the second largest AONB in England and Wales. The local climate was scientifically classified as "Sub-Arctic" and snow has sometimes lain on Cross Fell into June (there is an alpine ski area Yad Moss).

Lower Teesdale has mixed urban (Tees Valley or Teesside) and rural (Cleveland) parts. Roseberry Topping is a notable hill on the south eastern side, of which this and other adjoining hills form the northern end of the North York Moors.

Newer terms have gained stronger associations with separate parts of the valley due to their use as specific political constituencies and authorities.

Geology

Unusually for the Pennines, rock of igneous origin (the Whin Sill) contributes to the surface geology and scenery of Upper Teesdale. Around 295 million years ago upwelling magma spread through fissures and between strata in the earlier Carboniferous Limestone country rock. As it cooled (an event which is believed to have lasted 50 years) the rock contracted and caused itself to split into vertical columns. The heating of the limestone above the rock also caused it to be turned into a crumbly marble known as Sugar Limestone.

Economic deposits in Llandovery rocks include soft shales that were previously worked to be used as slate pencils.

More recently, Ice Age glacial activity shaped the valley, and much of the pre-glacial river course is now buried beneath glacial drift.

Botany
In places this impervious dolerite rock, with shallow soil above it, prevented the growth of scrub or trees: this enabled certain post-glacial Arctic / Alpine plants to survive here when elsewhere as a rule they were overgrown. The Sugar Limestone formed by thermal metamorphism of the limestone into which the Whin Sill was intruded also meets the requirements of some of these plants. Teesdale is famous among naturalists for the "Teesdale Assemblage" of plants found together here that occur widely separated in other locations, abroad or in the British Isles.

Part of Upper Teesdale near the Cow Green Reservoir is designated a National Nature Reserve; it contains the unique Teesdale Violet and the blue Spring Gentian as well as more common Pennine flowers such as rockrose, spring sandwort, mountain pansy, bird's-eye primrose and butterwort. Hay meadows in the valley above High Force, some now carefully cultivated to ensure this, contain an extremely rich variety of flowering plants including globe flower, wood cranesbill and Early Purple Orchid. On the south bank of the Tees near High Force can be seen the largest surviving juniper wood in England.

Geography and history
Over ledges in the Whin Sill fall the famous waterfalls of High Force and Low Force and the cataract of Cauldron Snout. The Tees then reaches and passes between Barnard Castle and Startforth, thereafter passing to the south of Darlington, through the borough of Stockton-on-Tees and north of Middlesbrough, reaching the North Sea between the boroughs of Hartlepool and Redcar & Cleveland. The Skerne runs through Darlington while the Leven starts and runs between Yarm and Ingleby Barwick in the borough of Stockton-on-Tees then through Stokesley then Great Ayton in the Hambleton District borough.

West Teesdale's principal town and most populous settlement is Barnard Castle, a historic market town that is home to the renowned Bowes Museum. It also includes the small town of Middleton-in-Teesdale and a number of villages, including Mickleton, Eggleston, Romaldkirk and Cotherstone. Middleton was a lead-mining centre, and plentiful traces of this industry can be seen round the adjoining slopes and side-valleys. On the south side of Teesdale looms the Bronze Age burial site of Kirkcarrion.

East Teesdale has been described as being the area between the a point west of Darlington and Teesmouth, where the Tees flows through flatter country, which is also known also as Tees Valley. Middlesbrough is the most populous town in the valley as a whole.

The valley runs roughly parallel to Weardale (including Bishop Auckland and Sunderland), Durham Dales on the northern side and south is Swaledale (including Richmond), Yorkshire Dales to the west and the Cleveland Hills, North York Moors to the east.

Teesdale gave its name to the former Teesdale district of County Durham, although the south side of Teesdale lies within the historic county boundaries of the North Riding of Yorkshire. Formerly the Startforth Rural District, it was transferred to County Durham for administrative and ceremonial purposes on 1 April 1974, under the provisions of the Local Government Act 1972. All of West Teesdale lies within the parliamentary constituency of Bishop Auckland (County Durham).

Uses in local culture
Teesdale (district), County Durham
Teesdale Allotments, Site of Special Scientific Interest in the Teesdale district
Teesdale Mercury, newspaper
Middleton-in-Teesdale
Forest-in-Teesdale
Teesdale School, Barnard Castle
Teesdale Way, path following the river Tees
Teesdale Iron Works, former name of defunct Head Wrightson large heavy industrial firm based at Thornaby-on-Tees
Teesdale Business Park, on the site of the former works
Teesdale Park, Thornaby FC Ground

See also
Cleveland, England
Cleveland Hills
List of Sites of Special Scientific Interest in Cleveland
Teesside

References

External links
Explore Teesdale
Bowes Museum, Barnard Castle
Middleton Plus
North Pennines Area of Outstanding Natural Beauty (AONB) and European Geopark
Yad Moss Ski Area

River Tees
Valleys of North Yorkshire
Valleys of County Durham

nl:Teesdale